Matías Agustín Benítez (born 11 October 1999) is an Argentine professional footballer who plays as a midfielder for Defensores de Belgrano.

Career
Benítez got his senior career underway with Acassuso. He came off the bench twice in 2017–18, before making his first start in the subsequent season's opener against Colegiales on 21 August 2018. Four days later, on 25 August, he scored his first goal in a draw versus Comunicaciones. Further goals in fixtures with San Telmo and Almirante Brown followed, as he made eighteen appearances in the first half of 2018–19.

Ahead of the 2022 season, Benítez signed with Primera Nacional side Defensores de Belgrano.

Career statistics
.

References

External links

1999 births
Living people
Place of birth missing (living people)
Argentine footballers
Association football midfielders
Primera B Metropolitana players
Club Atlético Acassuso footballers
Defensores de Belgrano footballers